Apirana Tuahae Kaukapakapa Mahuika (1 May 1934 – 9 February 2015) was a New Zealand Māori tribal leader. He was chair of Te Rūnanga o Ngāti Porou from its establishment in 1987 until his death in 2015.

Biography
Mahuika was born at Whakawhitira, near Tikitiki, in 1934 to Te Hamana and Tangipo Hemoata Mahuika, and was the youngest of 14 children. Educated at Te Aute College, he gained a Bachelor of Arts from the University of Auckland and a Master of Arts from the University of Sydney. He was ordained as an Anglican minister in 1962.

He taught at a number of institutions, including St Stephen's School at Bombay, The Correspondence School, Wellington Teachers' College and the University of Waikato, and was awarded an honorary doctorate by the latter establishment in 2004. He was also a member of the council of the University of Waikato. In 1990, Mahuika was awarded the New Zealand 1990 Commemoration Medal. In the 1990s, he was a board member of Te Papa and was instrumental in appointing Cliff Whiting to be joint CEO, or kaihautū, with Cheryll Sotheran. 

Mahuika chaired the working party that led to the formation of the Ngāti Porou iwi authority, Te Rūnanga o Ngāti Porou, and he was elected its inaugural chair. He held that post for over 27 years, until his death, and led the iwi through the Treaty of Waitangi settlement process with the Crown.

Before his death, Mahuika was a contributing member as a kaumātua to the Matiki Mai Aotearoa Working Group developing Māori-led constitutional thinking for New Zealand. He died in Gisborne in 2015.

References

1934 births
2015 deaths
Ngāti Porou people
People educated at Te Aute College
University of Auckland alumni
University of Sydney alumni
Academic staff of the University of Waikato
Academic staff of the Victoria University of Wellington
New Zealand Anglican priests
Te Aho o Te Kura Pounamu faculty